Olrik may refer to:

Olrik Fjord, a fjord in Avannaata municipality, Greenland
Colonel Olrik, a character from the Blake and Mortimer comic series

People with the surname
Dagmar Olrik (1860–1932), Danish painter and tapestry artist.
Henrik Olrik (1830–1890), Danish painter and sculptor
Christian Søren Marcus Olrik (1815–1870), Royal Inspector of North Greenland